Spokoyny is a rural locality (a settlement) in Krasnooktyabrskoye Rural Settlement of Maykopsky District, Russia. The population was 38 as of 2010. There is one street.

Geography 
Spokoyny is located 18 km northwest of Tulsky (the district's administrative centre) by road. Prirechny is the nearest rural locality.

References 

Rural localities in Maykopsky District